"Years After You" is a song written by Thom Schuyler, and recorded by Eddie Rabbitt in 1982 on his Radio Romance album.  It was then covered to much greater success in 1984 by American country music artist John Conlee.  It was released in October 1984 as the first single from his album Blue Highway.  The song reached #2 on the Billboard Hot Country Singles & Tracks chart.

Content
The song is about a middle-aged man who, several years after his breakup with a long-term girlfriend, is still missing her and—despite having his good days—struggling to cope.

Additional Cover versions
 A cover version by Linda Davis was included on her 1992 self-titled album.

Chart performance

References

1985 singles
Eddie Rabbitt songs
John Conlee songs
Linda Davis songs
Songs written by Thom Schuyler
MCA Records singles
1982 songs